Davidovo may refer to:

 In Bulgaria (written in Cyrillic as Давидово):
 Davidovo, Silistra Province - a village in the Kaynardzha municipality, Silistra Province
 Davidovo, Targovishte Province - a village in the Targovishte municipality, Targovishte Province
 In North Macedonia
 Davidovo, Gevgelija - a village in the Gevgelija Municipality